The following are notable people who were either born, raised or have lived for a significant period of time in Shkodër.

List 

Queen Teuta, reign 231-227 BC
King Gentius, reign 181-168 BC
Fahrettin Altay, hero of Turkish War of Independence, comrade of Mustafa Kemal Atatürk
Muhammad Nasiruddin al-Albani, was an Albanian Islamic scholar who specialised in the fields of hadith and fiqh
Hasan Rıza Pasha, He was the main commander during the Siege of Shkodër and became the symbol of resistance against the Serbian
Ramiz Alia, last Communist leader of Albania
Arilena Ara, singer
Marin Barleti, 15th century Albanian historian and priest
Cevdet Belbez, Ottoman governor of Van
Marin Beçikemi, 15th century Albanian philosopher, orator, and professor
Bushati family, prominent Ottoman Albanian family
Cafo Beg Ulqini, Albanian Nationalist
Elhaida Dani, The Voice of Italy winner and Albanian Eurovision representative
Simon Gjoni, composer
Karl Gurakuqi, linguist and folklorist.
Luigj Gurakuqi, one of the leaders of the Albanian national movement
Elis Guri, former world champion Greco-Roman wrestler
Anton Harapi, franciscan friar
Kolë Idromeno, painter and photographer
Prenkë Jakova, author of the first Albanian opera.
Zef Jubani, folklorist and activist of the Albanian National Awakening
Irhan Jubica, writer and publisher
Branko Kadija, communist, People's Hero of Albania
Hamza bey Kazazi, fighter
Palokë Kurti, footballer, athlete, sports organizer, and sports journalist
Tinka Kurti, actress
Vojo Kushi, Albanian World War II hero and People's Hero of Albania
Jordan Misja, communist, People's Hero of Albania
Henrik Lacaj, translator and scholar
Angela Martini, model and former Miss Universe Albania
Ndre Mjeda,  Catholic romantic poet
Mjeda family,  noble Albanian family
Hilë Mosi, politician and poet
Muhammad Nasiruddin al-Albani, Islamic scholar
Ndoc Nikaj, priest, historian and writer
Prend Doçi, priest, historian and writer
Millosh Gjergj Nikolla, poet (pen name Migjeni)
Bernardin Palaj, Franciscan cleric, folklorist and poet.
Zef Pllumi, writer, historian, priest
Erkand Qerimaj, world champion of weightlifting
Gjergj Radovani, Bishop of Shkodër and later Archbishop of Bar
Perlat Rexhepi, communist, People's Hero of Albania
Filip Shiroka, renaissance poet
Mehmet Shpendi, guerrilla fighter
Hodo Sokoli, leader of the League of Prizren
Ramadan Sokoli, ethnomusicologist
Ibrahim Tukiqi, singer
Vaso Pasha, writer, poet and publicist of the Albanian National Awakening
Rudi Vata, footballer
Lazër Vladanji, Archbishop of the Roman Catholic Archdiocese of Bar in the 18th century
Gjergj Vladanji, Bishop of the Roman Catholic Diocese of Sapë in the 18th century
Çesk Zadeja, composer
Skënder Temali, writer
Xhezair Zaganjori, Chief Justice of the Supreme Court of Albania
Bardhok Biba

See also 
 List of Albanians

References

Shkodër
Shkodër